Quintus Roscius (ca. 126 BC – 62 BC) was a Roman actor. The cognomen Gallus is dubious, as it appears only once as a scholia in a manuscript of Cicero's Pro Archia.

Life

Constiteram exorientem Auroram forte salutans    cum subito a laeva Roscius exoritur.  Pace mihi liceat, caelestes, dicere vestra   mortalis visus pulchrior esse deo. 

I stood by chance to greet the uprising Aurora, when suddenly, on the left, Roscius rose up. Please, o heavenly gods, give me leave to say that a mortal seemed to me more handsome than a god.—Quintus Lutatius Catulus

Roscius was born a slave in Lanuvium, about 3 miles (4.8 km) from Rome. Later he would encourage the legend that his nursemaid once found a snake coiled around him in his crib, a very auspicious omen, but Cicero scoffed at the veracity of this story. His master sent him to be trained as an actor after observing his penchant for mimicry. For many years he received no remuneration as it was the custom for slave-owners to take most or all of their slaves' salaries but eventually his master permitted him to keep part of his earnings and in time he bought his freedom.

The name Roscius was his former master's, a legacy of his servitude. Provided this cognomen is correct, Gallus might have been his slave name but might also have signified that his father was a Gallic slave.  No other Roman actor obtained comparable popularity and esteem. So highly was he regarded that even his pupils were assured of success on the boards. The refined Greek method of acting was currently out of vogue in favor of coarser fodder, but Roscius overturned this view, demonstrating that the highest art lies in moderation, not clown-like antics. With an ostensibly handsome face and manly figure, his looks were immortalized in verse by Quintus Lutatius Catulus. He studied the delivery and gestures of the most distinguished advocates in the Forum, especially Quintus Hortensius, and won universal praise for his grace and elegance on the stage. He especially excelled in comedy. Cicero took lessons from him. The two often engaged in friendly rivalry to try whether the orator or the actor could express a thought or emotion with the greater effect, and Roscius wrote a treatise in which he compared acting and oratory. Catulus composed a quatrain in his honour, and the dictator Sulla presented him with a gold ring, the badge of the equestrian order, a remarkable distinction for an actor in Rome, where the profession was held in contempt.

Like his contemporary Aesopus, Roscius amassed a large fortune, being paid 1000 denarii per performance at his peak. He appears to have retired from the stage some time before his death. In 76 BC he was sued by C. Fannius Chaerea for 50,000 sesterces.

Reputation

By the Renaissance, Roscius formed the paradigm for dramatic excellence. When Thomas Nashe wanted to praise Edward Alleyn as the best actor of his generation, he called Alleyn a Roscius (Pierce Penniless, 1592); John Downes titled his history of Restoration drama Roscius Anglicanus (1708). The African American actor Ira Aldridge, who was born in New York in 1807 and died in Lodz, Poland in 1867, and one of the finest Shakespearean actors of his age, was known as 'The African Roscius'.

In literature
Roscius is mentioned by Hamlet in Act II, Scene II of Shakespeare's tragedy, and in Henry VI, Part 3 Act 5, Scene 6

In the 1850 novel David Copperfield by Charles Dickens, the character Mr. Barkis calls the title character 'a young Roeshus', the misspelling apparently meant to reflect Barkis' rustic background.

References

H.H. Pfluger, Cicero's Rede pro Q. Roscio Comoedo (1904). 

120s BC births
62 BC deaths
Republican era slaves and freedmen
Ancient Roman actors
2nd-century BC Romans
1st-century BC Romans
Roscii